Inala is a suburb in the City of Brisbane, Queensland, Australia.

Geography

Inala Avenue/Poinsettia Street is the main roadway east–west and Serviceston Avenue/Rosemary Street and Blunder Road are the main roads stretching north–south. Newer estate Forest Lake is situated to the south; other surrounding suburbs include Durack, Darra and Oxley to the north; Richlands, Ellen Grove and Wacol to the west; and Willawong, Acacia Ridge, Pallara and Doolandella to the East.

History
The suburb was named Inala by the Queensland Surveyor-General on 10 January 1952, using a  Bundjalung word meaning resting time or night time.  It was previously known as Boylands Pocket.

Following World War II there was a shortage of 250,000 houses across Australia. In Queensland alone over 4,000 families were living in makeshift dwellings of tin, calico and canvas. The Queensland and Australian Governments responded by making housing a priority.

The history of Inala started as the suburb of Serviceton, established following a meeting held in a Brisbane RSL Hall in May 1946. A group of ex-servicemen, led by Harold (Hock) Davis, were seeking affordable accommodation for their families during the post-war housing shortage. The Serviceton Co-operative Society was formed and they purchased 480 hectares of flood-safe land, which was then divided amongst the shareholders, giving them 800 square metres each. At that stage, Inala was planned as a satellite town set on a broad, high, gently sloping ridge.

In 1949–1950 the Queensland Housing Commission purchased Serviceton, comprising approximately 850 acres (3.4 km2) of land, from the faltering Serviceton Housing Co-operative. The Housing Commission subsequently annexed another 200 acres (0.8 km2) to the suburb and changed its name to Inala in 1953 to avoid postal confusion with another Serviceton in Victoria.

Inala State School opened on 1 July 1955. In September 1974 it was expanded to include a pre-school.

Inala Methodist Church opened in 1957, becoming Inala Uniting Church in 1977 when the Methodist Church amalgamated into the Uniting Church in Australia.

Inala West State School opened on 2 January 1960 at 2 Deodor Street (end of Biota Street). It closed on 31 December 2009. The school's website was archived.

Serviceton South State School opened on 2 September 1963 and celebrated its 50th Anniversary on 2 September 2013.

Samoa Methodist Church Inala was established circa 1965.

Richlands East State School opened on 23 January 1967 in Poinsettia Street. It is now within the boundaries of Inala.

Inala Special School opened on 26 August 1968. On 1 January 2007 it was renamed Western Suburbs State Special School.

Inala State High School opened on 30 January 1962. It closed on 15 December 1995 to amalgamate with Richlands State High School to create Glenala State High School on the Inala State High School site. Despite the name, Inala State High School was in neighbouring Durack on the north-east corner of Glenala Road and Hampton Street.

The median age of the Inala population was 34 years, 3 years below the Australian median. 45.9% of people living in Inala were born in Australia, compared to the national average of 66.7%; the next most common countries of birth were 19.4% Vietnam, 3.1% New Zealand, 2.0% Samoa and 1.9% England. 39.8% of people spoke only English at home. Inala had the largest Buddhist community (2,055 people; 13.8%) and the largest Vietnamese Australian community (4,446 people; 30.0%) of any suburb in Queensland.

Education 

Inala State School is a government primary (Prep-6) school for boys and girls at Rosemary Street. In 2018, the school had an enrolment of 539 students with 40 teachers (37 full-time equivalent) and 39 non-teaching staff (26 full-time equivalent). It includes a special education program.

Serviceton South State School is a government primary (Prep-6) school for boys and girls at 59 Lorikeet Street. In 2018, the school had an enrolment of 364 students with 34 teachers (27 full-time equivalent) and 29 non-teaching staff (16 full-time equivalent). It includes a special education program.

Richlands East State School is a government primary (Prep-6) school for boys and girls at 99 Poinsettia Street. In 2018, the school had an enrolment of 555 students with 43 teachers (37 full-time equivalent) and 35 non-teaching staff (22 full-time equivalent). It includes a special education program.

St Mark's School is a Catholic primary (Prep-6) school for boys and girls at 92 Lilac Street. In 2018, the school had an enrolment of 487 students with 38 teachers (32 full-time equivalent) and 21 non-teaching staff (13 full-time equivalent).

Inala Flexible Learning Centre is a Catholic secondary (7-12) school for boys and girls at 79 Poinsettia Street. It is operated by Edmund Rice Education Australia and provides individual educational programs for children who do not engage effectively with mainstream education for a variety of reasons. In 2018, the school had an enrolment of 70 students with 11 teachers (8 full-time equivalent) and 13 non-teaching staff (8 full-time equivalent).

Western Suburbs State Special School is a primary and secondary (Prep-12) school providing special education for boys and girls at Glenala Road. In 2018, the school had an enrolment of 175 students with 48 teachers (43 full-time equivalent) and 65 non-teaching staff (39 full-time equivalent).

There is no secondary school in Inala. The nearest government secondary schools are Glenala State High School in neighbouring Durack to the east and Forest Lake State High School in neighbouring Forest Lake to the south.

Inala also has a campus of the TAFE Queensland at 54 Thrush Street.

Amenities

Shopping 
There are several shopping precincts within Inala. The joined Inala Plaza–Civic Centre complex located on the corner of Kittyhawk and Inala Avenues is the largest precinct in Inala. It offers two major supermarkets, Vietnamese markets, restaurants, and a wide variety of independent shops. Other shops and restaurants exist on Biota Street located to the north, on Skylark Street to the east, and on the junction of Lavender and Lilac Streets.

Services 
Inala has two post offices, numerous medical centres and services, many of which are bulk billing.

Most government services are located within the Inala Plaza precinct and its surrounds. These include a Brisbane City Council Library, Department of Communities, Department of Corrective Services and a Medicare and Centrelink office.

Culture 
There are two community halls and a community art gallery.

The Inala Library opened in 1963 with a major refurbishment in 1994 and a smaller renovation in 2011.

Community groups 
The Richlands, Inala and Suburbs History Group is dedicated to the research of local history and diverse cultural heritage, historical presentations and book publications on the topics of local history, community and culture.

There are a large number of government funded and non-government non-profit community organisations and programs located in Inala, some of these include Inala Community Centre, Hub Neighbourhood Centre, Inala Community House, Skylarkers Healthy Ageing, Western Districts Out of Home Care, Inala Youth Service, Western Districts Family Steps, Childcare Access, Equity Resource Support Unit.

Parks 

Inala has a high ratio of green areas and parks, most of which are named after prominent people who helped establish the suburb or contributed to the community. The parks and the large numbers of grown native trees through the suburb maintain the ecosystem of Inala, quiet environment and clean air.

Special pedestrian walkways between residential houses facilitate residents' access to bus stops, schools, shops and recreational areas. Inala has four dog parks with fenced off-leash areas, shelters, benches and water taps, located at Kev Hooper Park on Lavender Street, at Richlands Depot Park on Government Road, on the corner of Inala Avenue and Sycamore Street, and on Kimberley Street near C.J. Greenfield Park.

Places of worship 
In 2016 Census, 31.3% of Inala residents stated no religious affiliation, followed by Inala's two major religious affiliations: Catholic (21.2%) and Buddhism (13.8%).

Inala Uniting Church is at  29 Berrigan Street. It is part of the Bremer Brisbane Presbytery of the Uniting Church in Australia.

Samoa Methodist Church Inala is at 472 Archerfield Road.

Inala Samoan Church conduct their services at the Old Inala Hall on the corner of Abelia Street and Rosemary Street; it is part of the Wesleyan Methodist Church.

Inala Tongan Church conduct their services at the Seventh Day Adventist Church at 124 Crocus Street; it is part of the Wesleyan Methodist Church.

Forest Lake Samoan Church conduct their services on the corner of Corsair Avenue and Inala Avenue (approx ); it is part of the Wesleyan Methodist Church.

Other churches and religious places in the suburb include:

 Anglican Church, St Hugh's Parish Inala
 Assemblies of God (Australian Christian Churches)
 Buddhist Temple Chùa Pháp Quang
 Buddhist Temple Chùa Phật Đà
 Church of Jesus Christ of Latter-day Saints
 Christian Reformation Community Church
 Citipointe West Church
 Gospel Hall
 Great Hope Baptist Church
 Multi-Cultural Baptist Church
 Place of Peace Church of the Nazarene
 Salvation Army
 Seventh-day Adventist Church
 St Mark's Catholic Parish
 Sikh Temple Guru Nanak Gurdwara
 Vietnamese Catholic Community Brisbane (Cộng Đồng Công Giáo Việt Nam Brisbane)
 Vietnamese English Baptist Church (Hội Thánh Tinh Lành Báp-tít Việt-Anh)

Sports 
Sport and recreation facilities include a Police Citizens Youth Club gym and fitness centre, a number of Brisbane City Council parks and recreation areas, sport ovals and facilities, and the Inala Skate Park (D.J. Sherrington Park).

Other sporting clubs include:
 Blue Fin Fishing Club
 Brisbane Lions Soccer Club
 West Inala Panthers Rugby League Football Club
 West Inala Panthers Junior Rugby League Football Club

Events 
Big celebrations such as Multicultural Fiesta and Lunar New Year (Tết) are held regularly.

Transport

Buses conduct services from Inala bus station near the Inala Plaza shopping centre through the Inala suburb, to railway stations nearest to Inala: Richlands, Darra, Oxley, to Forest Lake Village Shopping Centre, Mount Ommaney Shopping Centre, Garden City Shopping Centre, Princess Alexandra Hospital and QEII Hospital. Paths for easy pedestrian and bike access from Inala to Richlands station are set in the area development plan. Inala also has bus connections to Salisbury, Moorooka and Coopers Plains railway stations, and to Woolloongabba busway station, South Bank and the Brisbane City via the frequent express bus route 100 that operates from early morning until late night.

Inala has a very good access to Ipswich Motorway, Centenary Motorway and Logan Motorway, and further to Warrego Highway and Cunningham Highway.

Political representation
Les Bryant, former ALP Richlands Ward Councillor, represented Inala in the Brisbane City Council for 17 years, 1991–2008. The Bryant family moved onto Blunder Road late 1946, when there was nothing but bushland where Inala now stands. They saw Inala grow from early beginnings to what it is today, a mature, successful multi cultural local community. Les and his wife Margaret still live in the Inala district today in retirement, in sister suburb Durack.  Les was succeeded by Milton Dick (Australian Labor Party A.L.P.) in 2008, who moved into Federal politics winning the Federal Division of Oxley in 2016. Charles Strunk (ALP) won the renamed old Ward of Richlands, now Forest Lake Ward, in 2016, to become the new Brisbane City Councillor for Forest Lake Ward. Annastacia Palaszczuk (ALP) is the Member of the Queensland Legislative Assembly for Inala; she became Premier of Queensland in 2015.

Culture and ethnicity
Inala is a vibrant multicultural society boasting more than 20 different nationalities.

Architecture
The development of Inala coincided with the emergence of architectural modernism in Australia. The innovative designs of young southern architects such as Robin Boyd, Roy Grounds and Harry Seidler featured the efficient use of space with minimal ornamentation, utilisation of new materials and techniques, and above all design simplicity, while striving to build solid houses that would require little maintenance. Inala was designed and built in Modernist Revival style with elements of Art Deco. It was both aesthetically successful and a practical architectural solution.

The post-war worldwide shortage of building materials coupled with huge demands created the impetus for exploring and using new materials and techniques in Inala. The choice to use reinforced concrete in the construction of Inala houses was made because of its strength, reliability and flexibility. Inala also had the advantage of good access to the local cement and concrete made from washed river sand and lime from Moreton Bay coral shipped up the river by barge and processed at Darra. Concrete was an ideal material for the fashionable Modernist style. Inala houses were built on raised concrete foundations, framed with hardwood timber, floored with hard-wearing brushbox, with silky oak used for window frames. The outer walls were constructed of poured concrete approximately 18 cm thick, internal walls and ceilings – with rendered wire lath. These robust construction techniques also served to minimise maintenance costs and achieve a long life span of the houses.

Notable residents
Former Inala resident, Joanna Lindgren was an LNP Australian Senator for Queensland in 2015 and 2016; the niece of Neville Bonner AO, Joanna is the first Aboriginal female Senator for Queensland.

References

Further reading

External links
 University of Queensland: Queensland Places: Inala
 Richlands, Inala and Suburbs History Group Inc: Inala.
 Inala Elders Digital Stories Resource Project, State Library of Queensland
 Photographs of Inala Civic Centre, State Library of Queensland

Suburbs of the City of Brisbane